Oplurus saxicola (marked Madagascar swift) is a saxicolous (rock dwelling) iguana. The name of this species, saxicola, comes from the Latin saxum, meaning stone or rock, as they live within that environment.

Description
Extremely depressed reddish-green body, with marked spots. White abdomen. Large throat.  Eyes very large, of triangular form. The scales of the forefeet are webbed; the thighs of rear legs are muscular.  Scales on the neck are of similar dimensions to those on the back.

Distribution 
The marked Madagascar swift is endemic to the province of Toliara in south-west Madagascar.

References

Oplurus
Reptiles of Madagascar
Endemic fauna of Madagascar
Reptiles described in 1869